The 1987 Leicester City Council election took place on 7 May 1987 to elect members of Leicester City Council in England. This was on the same day as other local elections.

From this election, the council moved from staggered council elections back to all-out elections.

Summary

|}

References

Leicester
Leicester City Council elections
1980s in Leicestershire